The Barry Award is a crime literary prize awarded annually since 1997 by the editors of Deadly Pleasures, an American quarterly publication for crime fiction readers. From 2007 to 2009 the award was jointly presented  with the publication Mystery News. The prize is named after Barry Gardner, an American critic.

Winners

Best Mystery/Crime Novel of the Decade

Best British Crime Novel 
The "British Crime Novel" in this context is best crime fiction novel first published in English in the United Kingdom and does not reflect the author's nationality.

2000s

2010s

Best First Novel

1990s

2000s

2010s

2020s

Best Novel

1990s

2000s

2010s

2020s

Best Paperback Original

1990s

2000s

2010s

2020s

Best Short Story

2000s

2010s

Best Thriller

2000s

2010s

2020s

References 

Mystery and detective fiction awards
American literary awards
Awards established in 1997
 
 
1997 establishments in the United States